Joseph Bruno Aimé Miville Déchêne,  (November 8, 1881 – January 18, 1944) was a lawyer and political figure in Quebec. He represented Montmagny in the House of Commons of Canada from 1917 to 1925 as a Liberal.

Biography
He was born in Sainte-Louise, Quebec on November 8, 1881, the son of Alphonse Arthur Miville Déchêne and Aurore Ouellet. He was educated at the Séminaire de Québec and the Université Laval. Déchêne married Bernadette Bernier. He was called to the Quebec bar in 1906. In 1918, he was named King's Counsel. Déchêne was seigneur of Sainte-Anne de la Pocatière. He served as crown prosecutor for Montmagny district. In 1935, he was named Director of the Parliamentary Post Office. He died in Quebec City at the age of 62.

His uncle François-Gilbert Miville Dechêne served in the Quebec assembly.

Electoral record

References

Members of the House of Commons of Canada from Quebec
Liberal Party of Canada MPs
Laurier Liberals
1881 births
1944 deaths
Canadian King's Counsel
French Quebecers